is the fourth and final series of Ojamajo Doremi. The series was directed by Takuya Igarashi and produced by Toei Animation. It was broadcast on TV Asahi from February 3, 2002, to January 26, 2003, and lasted 51 episodes. The series deals with the sudden growth of Hana, who has aged herself voluntarily and is given permission to become a witch apprentice. At the same time, the former witch queen's curse has gone into full bloom, but the curse can be stopped if Doremi and the girls can remind her of her fondest memories, which involves the tedious task of recreating the gifts she made and received from her grandchildren. 

The first ending theme song was titled , performed by Masami Nakatsukasa. By episode 31, the ending song switched back to "Watashi no Tsubasa" for the remainder of the show. The final episode features a special all-cast version of "Watashi no Tsubasa" and was performed by the voice cast.

This season ranked #15 on the 26th annual readers' poll in the June 2004 issue of Animage.

Episode list

References

2002 Japanese television series debuts
2003 Japanese television series endings
Ojamajo Doremi series
Ojamajo Doremi episode lists